Hanumana Gundi Falls, also known as Suthanabbe Falls or Soothanabbi Falls is located in the hilly surroundings of the Kudremukh National Park in the Chikkamagaluru district of Karnataka, India.

Hanumanagundi Falls is located between Karkala and Lakya Dam in the Kudremukh national park.

References

Geography of Chikkamagaluru district
Waterfalls of Karnataka
Tiered waterfalls
Tourist attractions in Chikkamagaluru district